In economics, a complementary good is a good whose appeal increases with the popularity of its complement. Technically, it displays a negative cross elasticity of demand and that demand for it increases when the price of another good decreases. This is in contrast to a substitute good, whose demand decreases when its substitute's price decreases.

When two goods are complements, they experience joint demand - the demand of one good is linked to the demand for another good. Therefore, if a higher quantity is demanded of one good, a higher quantity will also be demanded of the other, and vice versa. For example, the demand for razor blades may depend on the number of razors in use; this is why razors have sometimes been sold as loss leaders, to increase demand for the associated blades. Another example is that sometimes a toothbrush is packaged free with toothpaste. The toothbrush is a complement to the toothpaste; the cost of producing a toothbrush may be higher than toothpaste, but its sales depends on the demand of toothpaste.

All non-complementary goods can be considered substitutes. The opposite is true for substitutes: the consumer is willing to pay less for each marginal unit of good "" as it accumulates more of good "".

Complementarity may be driven by psychological processes in which the consumption of one good (e.g., cola) stimulates demand for its complements (e.g., a cheeseburger). Consumption of a food or beverage activates a goal to consume its complements: foods that consumers believe would taste better together. Drinking cola increases consumers' willingness to pay for a cheeseburger. This effect appears to be contingent on consumer perceptions of these relationships rather than their sensory properties.

Examples

An example of this would be the demand for cars and petrol. The supply and demand for cars is represented by the figure, with the initial demand . If the price of petrol were to decrease by some amount, this would result in a higher quantity of cars demanded. This higher quantity demanded would cause the demand curve to shift rightward to a new position . Other examples include automobiles and fuel, mobile phones and cellular service, printer and cartridge, among others.

Perfect complement

A perfect complement is a good that must be consumed with another good. The indifference curve of a perfect complement exhibits a right angle, as illustrated by the figure. Such preferences can be represented by a Leontief utility function.

Few goods behave as perfect complements. One example is a left shoe and a right; shoes are naturally sold in pairs, and the ratio between sales of left and right shoes will never shift noticeably from 1:1.

The degree of complementarity, however, does not have to be mutual; it can be measured by the cross price elasticity of demand. In the case of video games, a specific video game (the complement good) has to be consumed with a video game console (the base good). It does not work the other way: a video game console does not have to be consumed with that game.

Example 
In marketing, complementary goods give additional market power to the producer. It allows vendor lock-in by increasing switching costs. A few types of pricing strategy exist for a complementary good and its base good:

Pricing the base good at a relatively low price - this approach allows easy entry by consumers (e.g. low-price consumer printer vs. high-price cartridge)
Pricing the base good at a relatively high price to the complementary good - this approach creates a barrier to entry and exit (e.g., a costly car vs inexpensive gas)

Gross complements
Sometimes the complement-relationship between two goods is not intuitive and must be verified by inspecting the cross-elasticity of demand using market data.

The elasticity does not need to be symmetrical.

Proof
The standard Hicks decomposition of the effect on the ordinary demand for a good  of a simple price change in a good , utility level  and chosen bundle  is

Effect of price change of complementary goods 

 Substitute good

References 

Goods (economics)
Utility function types